Goat Path may refer to:

 Pennsylvania Route 23
 Desire path